Minister of Sports and Youth was the person in charge of the Ministry of Sports and Youth of Montenegro (Ministarstvo sporta i mladih). Prior to 2016, the Minister of Education and Sports (Ministarstvo prosvjete i sporta) was in charge of youth and sports affairs. In 2020, Ministry once again merged into the Ministry of Education. It was once again re-established in 2022.

Ministers of Sports and Youth (2016-2020)

References

Government ministries of Montenegro
Ministries established in 2016
2016 establishments in Montenegro
Sports ministries